The Skete of Saint Panteleimon or Skete of Agiou Panteleimonos, not to be confused with the monastery of the same name, some kilometres away, is a skete of the Koutloumousiou monastery in Mount Athos, Greece. The skete is one of only a handful of Idiorrhythmic monasteries in the world.

The Skete was founded in 1785 by the monk Charalampos near the town of Karies, and is a dependent of the Koutloumousiou monastery. Today the skete consists of 19 cells with 20 monks, a library with 40 manuscripts of more than 500 books, as well as a church housing 200 icons and saintly relics.

References

Pantelimon
Greek Orthodox monasteries
Koutloumousiou Monastery